The R343 is a Regional Route in South Africa that connects the N2 at Grahamstown in the north and Kenton-on-Sea and the R72 in the south.

External links
 Routes Travel Info

References

Regional Routes in the Eastern Cape